Fibrolamellar carcinoma (FLC) is a rare form of carcinoma that typically affects young adults and is characterized, under the microscope, by laminated fibrous layers interspersed between the tumor cells.  Approximately 200 new cases are diagnosed worldwide each year. FLC, also known as fibrolamellar hepatocellular carcinoma, is different from the more common hepatocellular carcinoma (HCC) in that it afflicts young people with normal liver function and no known risk factors.

Cause

A recent study showed the presence of the DNAJB1-PRKACA chimeric transcript (resulting from a 400kb somatic deletion on chromosome 19) in 100% of the FLCs examined (15/15) This gene fusion has been confirmed in a second study.

Pathology
The histopathology of FLC is characterized by laminated fibrous layers, interspersed between the tumor cells.  Cytologically, the tumor cells have a low nuclear to cytoplasmic ratio with abundant eosinophilic cytoplasm.  Tumors are non-encapsulated, but well circumscribed, when compared to conventional HCC (which typically has an invasive border).

Diagnosis
Due to lack of symptoms, until the tumor is sizable, this form of cancer is often advanced when diagnosed. Symptoms include vague abdominal pain, nausea, abdominal fullness, malaise and weight loss. They may also include a palpable liver mass. Other presentations include jaundice, ascites, fulminant liver failure, encephalopathy, gynecomastia (males only), thrombophlebitis of the lower limbs, recurrent deep vein thrombosis, anemia and hypoglycemia.

The usual markers for liver disease – aspartate aminotransferase, alanine aminotransferase and alkaline phosphatase – are often normal or only slightly elevated. FLC often does not produce alpha fetoprotein (AFP), a widely used marker for conventional hepatocellular carcinoma. It is associated with elevated neurotensin levels.

Diagnosis is normally made by imaging (ultrasound, CT or MRI) and biopsy

Treatment
In FLC, plasma neurotensin and serum vitamin B12 binding globulin are commonly increased and are useful in monitoring the disease and detecting recurrence.

FLC can often be surgically removed. Liver resection is the optimal treatment and may need to be performed more than once, since this disease has a very high recurrence rate. Due to such recurrence, periodic follow-up medical imaging (CT or MRI) is necessary.

When the tumor cannot be removed surgically or when there is distant spread, many different systemic therapies are currently being used to treat the disease. However, no standard of care currently exists for FLC. Consequently, there remains a pressing need to identify proven, effective systemic therapies for the cancer.  Radiotherapy has been used but data is limited concerning its use. 

The FibroFoundation has resources available on different FLC treatment options. 

The survival rate for FLC largely depends on whether (and to what degree) the cancer has metastasized, i.e. spread to the lymph nodes or other organs. Distant spread (metastases), significantly reduces the median survival rate. Five-year survival rates vary between 40–90%.

Epidemiology

FLC accounts for 1–10% of primary liver cancers. It typically has a young age at presentation (20–40 years: mean age ~27 years) when compared to conventional HCC. Unlike the more common HCC, patients most often do not have coexistent liver disease such as cirrhosis.

History

This disease was first described by Hugh Edmondson in a 14-year-old female with no underlying liver disease. The name fibrolamellar hepatocellular carcinoma was coined by Craig et al. in 1980. It was not recognized as a distinct form of cancer by the WHO until 2010.

Additional images

References

External links 

Diseases of liver
Pediatric cancers
Digestive system neoplasia
Rare cancers